The 2019–20 season was a debut season in the top Ukrainian football league for Kolos Kovalivka. Kolos competed in Premier League and Ukrainian Cup. After winning play-off matches in Premier League Kolos qualified for European club tournament for the next season for the first time in clubs history.

Players

Squad information

Transfers

In

Out

Pre-season and friendlies

Competitions

Overall

Premier League

League table

Results summary

Results by round

Matches

Play-off round

Ukrainian Cup

Statistics

Appearances and goals

|-
! colspan=16 style=background:#dcdcdc; text-align:center| Goalkeepers

|-
! colspan=16 style=background:#dcdcdc; text-align:center| Defenders

|-
! colspan=16 style=background:#dcdcdc; text-align:center| Midfielders 

|-
! colspan=16 style=background:#dcdcdc; text-align:center| Forwards

|-
! colspan=16 style=background:#dcdcdc; text-align:center| Players transferred out during the season

Last updated: 29 July 2020

Goalscorers

Last updated: 29 July 2020

Clean sheets

Last updated: 29 July 2020

Disciplinary record

Last updated: 29 July 2020

Attendances

Last updated: 29 July 2020

References

External links
 Official website

Kolos Kovalivka
FC Kolos Kovalivka